The men's pole vault at the 2013 Southeast Asian Games, the athletics was held in Naypyidaw, Myanmar. The track and field events took place at the Wunna Theikdi Stadiumon December 16.

Schedule
All times are Myanmar Standard Time (UTC+06:30)

Records

Results 
Legend
NM — No Mark

References

Athletics at the 2013 Southeast Asian Games